Robert Clifford Speck (born August 8, 1956) is a former pitcher in Major League Baseball who played for the Atlanta Braves in its 1986 season. Listed at 6' 4", 195 lb., Speck batted and threw right handed. He was born  in Portland, Oregon.

The New York Mets selected Speck as their 17th pick in the first round of the 1974 MLB Draft. Nevertheless, he had to wait 12 years in the Minor Leagues before making his major league debut with his fifth organization.

Speck posted a 2-1 record with a 4.13 earned run average in 13 pitching appearances (one start), striking out 21 batters while walking 15 in 28⅓ innings of work for the Braves.

In addition, Speck went 90-104 with a 4.30 ERA in 377 minor league games from 1974–1988. Highlights of his minor league career included pitching in the longest game in the history of professional baseball, a 33 inning affair between Speck's Rochester Red Wings and the Pawtucket Red Sox. Speck was summoned to replace Steve Grilli with the bases loaded and no out, but he failed, allowing an RBI-single to Dave Koza in a 2-2 count which gave Pawtucket a 3–2 victory.

Sources

External links
, or Retrosheet, or Pelota Binaria (Venezuelan Winter League)

1956 births
Living people
Atlanta Braves players
Baseball players from Portland, Oregon
Buffalo Bisons (minor league) players
Cardenales de Lara players
American expatriate baseball players in Venezuela
Charlotte O's players
Columbus Clippers players
Denver Zephyrs players
Lynchburg Mets players
Major League Baseball pitchers
Marion Mets players
Oklahoma City 89ers players
Peninsula Pilots players
Reading Phillies players
Richmond Braves players
Rochester Red Wings players
Tidewater Tides players
Wausau Mets players